is a 2009 Japanese drama film starring Tomoya Nagase and Mayuko Fukuda. The film is a remake of the 1997 German criminal comedy Knockin' on Heaven's Door.

External links 
  
 

2009 films
2009 drama films
2000s Japanese-language films
Films set in Japan
Japanese remakes of foreign films
Remakes of German films
Japanese drama films
2000s Japanese films